{{Speciesbox
| image = Holothuria fuscopunctata in situ.JPG
| status = LC
| status_system = IUCN3.1
| status_ref = 
| taxon = Holothuria fuscopunctata
| authority = Jaeger, 1833<ref name=WoRMS>{{cite WoRMS |author=Paulay, Gustav |year=2018 |title=Holothuria (Microthele) fuscopunctata Jaeger, 1833 |id=210854 |accessdate=28 March 2018 }}</ref>
| synonyms = * Holothuria axiologa Clark, 1921
| synonyms_ref = 
}}Holothuria fuscopunctata, the elephant trunkfish, is a species of sea cucumber in the family Holothuriidae native to shallow water in the tropical Indo-Pacific. It is placed in the subgenus Microthele, making its full name Holothuria (Microthele) fuscopunctata.

Description
The body wall is thick and golden-brown with darker spots and dark brown wrinkles. The underside is whitish, the mouth being surrounded by twenty thick brown tentacles and the anus surrounded by a black band. The cloaca is large and black, but there are no Cuvierian tubules.

Distribution and habitatH. fuscopunctata has a wide distribution in the tropical Indo-Pacific. Its range extends from Madagascar and the eastern coast of Africa to Japan, China, Australia and the Mariana Islands, Palau and New Caledonia. On the African coast it mostly occurs on sandy seabeds and seagrass meadows, but in the Central Pacific, it mostly occurs on reef slopes and on coral rubble, although it also lives in seagrass beds.

Biology
This species feeds on organic material that it grazes on the seabed. It is slow to mature and has low fecundity. The sexes are separate and breeding takes place in the warm season, between December and January.

Status
Sea cucumbers are eaten in the Central Pacific. H. fuscopunctata'' is not particularly esteemed, but it is eaten as a poverty food in times of hardship, such as after cyclones. It is mostly harvested by skin-diving, and is likely to face greater exploitation as other more favoured species become scarcer. There are fisheries in Malaysia, the Philippines, Vietnam and Indonesia; in Madagascar; in the Western Pacific, including the Torres Strait, and in Tuvalu. For the time being, the International Union for Conservation of Nature has assessed its conservation status as being of "least concern", but it is vulnerable to over-exploitation because of its low fertility rate.

References 

Holothuriidae
Animals described in 1833